Elizabeth Gage MBE is a British jewellery designer and trained master goldsmith who has been creating collectable jewellery for over 50 years. She has been described by the trade as someone "whose large rings, historical references, gorgeous stones and elaborate craftsmanship set the tone for a whole generation".

Elizabeth Gage works in 18 and 22 carat gold. Her 'Helios' gold necklace, featured in Tatler magazine, took 203 grams of gold and 93 man hours to create. Elizabeth’s approach to design is as unique as the jewels themselves. She combines different elements in her work which she chooses for their individual beauty; exquisite stones, ancient bronzes, beautiful carvings, baroque pearls, in fact anything where the shape and colour inspire her.

Early career
After studying design at the Chelsea School of Art and at the Sir John Cass College, in 1968 Elizabeth received a commission from Cartier in New York City to create a special collection for their new catalogue. Four years later, she was presented with the coveted De Beers International Diamond Award. In 1989, she was awarded the Queen's Award for Export Achievement. In 2008 Elizabeth was presented the Lifetime Achievement Award by Retail Jeweller, a UK Jewellery publication.

Current work
A major US retrospective of Elizabeth Gage's work entitled 'The Enchanting Jewels of Elizabeth Gage' was held at the New Britain Museum of American Art. The critically acclaimed show ran from 25 April to 26 July 2015.

The 2015 auction at Bonhams New York of jewels belonging to the Hollywood legend Lauren Bacall featured one of Elizabeth Gage’s pieces; an enamel, cultured pearl and diamond “Camel” brooch. The brooch sold for $23,750, well above its $7,000 high estimate.
Bacall bought her first piece of jewellery from Elizabeth Gage in 1985 and went on to order a total of 23 pieces from her. Of her friendship with Lauren Bacall, Elizabeth says “Lauren Bacall was a strong woman and she knew her own truth. She was so easy to work with and we shared our inspirations. It was enormous fun designing for her. I shall miss her because as a woman, she was unique”.

Elizabeth's pieces constantly attract the attention of top fashion magazines and celebrities due to their unique quality. Some of her designs are included in the permanent jewellery collection of the Victoria and Albert Museum, London. She has recently published a book about her jewellery and her inspirations called The Unconventional Gage.

Elizabeth Gage regularly shows her new collections in New York, where she has a faithful following.

Gage was appointed Member of the Order of the British Empire (MBE) in the 2017 Birthday Honours for services to business.

References

External links
Official Website

British goldsmiths
British jewellery designers
Year of birth missing (living people)
Living people
British jewellers
Women metalsmiths
Members of the Order of the British Empire
Women jewellers